Derek John Blundell (born 1933) is a British geologist, now emeritus professor of geophysics, Royal Holloway, University of London.

He was president of the Geological Society from 1988 to 1990 and awarded the Society's Coke Medal in 1993.

Selected works

References 

British geologists
1933 births
Living people